The 1957 Kansas City Athletics season, the third for the team in Kansas City and the 57th in MLB, involved the A's finishing seventh in the American League with a record of 59 wins and 94 losses, 38½ games behind the American League Champion New York Yankees. The club drew 901,067 spectators, sixth in the league.

Offseason 
 October 15, 1956: Bob Cerv was purchased by the Athletics from the New York Yankees.
 February 19, 1957: Art Ditmar, Bobby Shantz, Jack McMahan, Wayne Belardi and players to be named later were traded by the Athletics to the New York Yankees for Irv Noren, Milt Graff, Mickey McDermott, Tom Morgan, Rip Coleman, Billy Hunter and a player to be named later. The Yankees completed their part of the deal by sending Jack Urban to the Athletics on April 5. The Athletics completed the deal by sending Curt Roberts to the Yankees on April 4 and Clete Boyer to the Yankees on June 4.
 Prior to 1957 season: Lou Klimchock was signed as an amateur free agent by the Athletics.

Regular season 
 First baseman Vic Power became the first black player to lead the American League in fielding percentage at any position. He led all American League first basemen with a .998 fielding average.
 Manager Lou Boudreau, in his third season at the helm, was fired August 4 with the Athletics standing at 36–67 (.350) and in eighth and last place in the American League. Coach Harry Craft, former skipper of the minor-league Kansas City Blues, succeeded Boudreau. Craft led the Athletics to a 23–27 mark, enabling them to escape the basement.

Season standings

Record vs. opponents

Notable transactions 
 June 15, 1957: Ryne Duren, Jim Pisoni, and Harry Simpson were traded by the Athletics to the New York Yankees for Ralph Terry, Woodie Held, Billy Martin, and Bob Martyn.
 August 1, 1957: Johnny Groth was purchased from the Athletics by the Detroit Tigers.
 August 27, 1957: Al Aber was selected off waivers by the Athletics from the Detroit Tigers.

Roster

Player stats

Batting

Starters by position 
Note: Pos = Position; G = Games played; AB = At bats; H = Hits; Avg. = Batting average; HR = Home runs; RBI = Runs batted in

Other batters 
Note: G = Games played; AB = At bats; H = Hits; Avg. = Batting average; HR = Home runs; RBI = Runs batted in

Pitching

Starting pitchers 
Note: G = Games played; IP = Innings pitched; W = Wins; L = Losses; ERA = Earned run average; SO = Strikeouts

Other pitchers 
Note: G = Games played; IP = Innings pitched; W = Wins; L = Losses; ERA = Earned run average; SO = Strikeouts

Relief pitchers 
Note: G = Games pitched; W = Wins; L = Losses; SV = Saves; ERA = Earned run average; SO = Strikeouts

Awards and honors

League leaders 
 Vic Power, American League leader, fielding percentage, first basemen (.998)

Farm system 

LEAGUE CHAMPIONS: Buffalo, Grand Island

References

External links
1957 Kansas City Athletics team page at Baseball Reference
1957 Kansas City Athletics team page at www.baseball-almanac.com

Oakland Athletics seasons
Kansas City Athletics season
1957 in sports in Missouri